Subtribe is a taxonomic category ranking which is below the rank of tribe and above genus. The standard suffix for a subtribe is -ina (in animals) or -inae (in plants). The early use of this word is from 19th century. An example of subtribe is Hyptidinae that contains approximately 400 accepted species distributed in 19 genera.

References 

 

 
Botanical nomenclature
Plant taxonomy
Zoological nomenclature